Greatest Hits is the first compilation album by American country music artist Bryan White. It was released in 2000 (see 2000 in country music) on Asylum Records. The album includes ten of his greatest hits from his first three studio albums: his 1994 self-titled debut, 1996's Between Now and Forever and 1997's The Right Place, as well as "From This Moment On", his 1998 duet with Shania Twain. Two new tracks, "How Long" and "The Way You Look at Me", are also included. The former was released as a single, peaking at #56 on the country charts in 2000.

Track listing

Personnel
Eddie Bayers- drums, percussion
Michael Black- background vocals
Bekka Bramlett- background vocals
Mike Brignardello- bass guitar
Dennis Burnside- electric piano
Larry Byrom- acoustic guitar, electric guitar
Mark Casstevens- acoustic guitar
Jerry Douglas- dobro
Dan Dugmore- pedal steel guitar, lap steel guitar
Stuart Duncan- fiddle
Scotty Emerick- acoustic guitar, background vocals
Paul Franklin- pedal steel guitar
Derek George- acoustic guitar, background vocals
Aubrey Haynie- fiddle
Wes Hightower- background vocals
John Hobbs- keyboards, organ
Dann Huff- electric guitar
John Barlow Jarvis- piano
Paul Leim- drums, percussion 
Chris Leuzinger- electric guitar
B. James Lowry- acoustic guitar
Liana Manis- background vocals
Steveland Marris- background vocals
Brent Mason- bass guitar, electric guitar
Randy McCormick- piano
Terry McMillan- percussion
Steve Nathan- keyboards, Hammond organ, piano, synthesizer, Wurlitzer
Michael Rhodes- bass guitar
Hargus "Pig" Robbins- electric piano
Matt Rollings- keyboards, piano
John Wesley Ryles- background vocals 
Steuart Smith- electric guitar
Harry Stinson- background vocals
Shania Twain- vocals on "From This Moment On"
Kenny Vaughn- baritone guitar, electric guitar
Billy Joe Walker Jr.- acoustic guitar, electric guitar 
Cindy Richardson-Walker- background vocals
Steve Wariner- background vocals
Bryan White- lead vocals, background vocals
Dennis Wilson- background vocals
Lonnie Wilson- drums
Glenn Worf- bass guitar, fuzz bass
Curtis Young- background vocals

Chart performance

References
Allmusic (see infobox)

2000 greatest hits albums
Bryan White albums
Asylum Records compilation albums